London Lions are a British professional basketball team based in Stratford, East London, England, and compete in the British Basketball League, the top tier of British basketball. The team was originally founded in 1977 as the Hemel Hempstead Lakers, and has previously been based in Hemel Hempstead, Watford and Milton Keynes.
The team moved to London in 2012 and, since 2013, has played its home games at the Copper Box Arena in the Queen Elizabeth Olympic Park.

In 2017, the Lions launched a women's team into the Women's British Basketball League after partnering with and rebranding the existing Barking Abbey Crusaders team as the London Lions.

London Lions is owned by 777 Partners. 777 Partners also purchased 45% of the British Basketball League (BBL) for £7m in December 2021. The balance of BBL is owned by the 10 clubs that compete in the BBL, including London, therefore, effectively 777 controls the BBL.

History

Hemel Hempstead Lakers
The club initially started out based in the town of Hemel Hempstead, 24 miles northwest of London, and were known as the Hemel Hempstead Lakers. The team was named after one of the NBA’s most famous teams, Los Angeles Lakers, and even adopted the LA Lakers' colours of purple and gold. In 1977, the Lakers entered the National Basketball League’s Division 2, and enjoyed a rather successful first season, finishing fifth (from 11 teams) with a 10–10 record. Their second season would be even more successful, with the Lakers finishing second in Division 2 (15–3) and winning promotion to the top-level league Division 1.

With entry into the country's top league ensured, the club received a major sponsorship deal from beverage brand Ovaltine, and as part of the deal were known as Ovaltine Hemel Hempstead. The franchise became a formidable force in Division 1, regularly finishing at the top-end of the table and making many appearances in the Play-off semi-finals at Wembley Arena, finishing third in 1981. Following the end of the Ovaltine sponsorship and a one-year deal with retailers Poundstretcher, the franchise was rebranded as the Hemel Royals in 1985. Meanwhile, on court, the team failed to reproduce the performances of the past few seasons and often settled for mid-table positions. This was a golden period in British Basketball and Hemel regularly brought top American talent from the States. Dick Miller is the greatest defensive player in the franchise's history and probably the game as a whole in the UK. The enigmatic Harvey Knuckles is considered one of the greatest players ever to play in Britain. Steve Hale was a fourth round draft pick, Sam Smith scored big points from all round the court and Daryl Thomas was a prolific scorer.

For the 1989–1990 season the franchise opted to leave the top-tier (now known as the Carlsberg League due to sponsorship from the Carlsberg Group) and return to the second-tier league, which had been renamed as NBL Division 1. After only one season, and a fourth-place finish (14–8), the Royals returned to Carlsberg League. The team finished bottom of the league in the 1992–1993 season with a 4–29 record, and were subsequently relegated back to Division 1, however they were later reinstated and returned to the rebranded BBL for the following season. A dismal spell ensued and over the next decade the team wouldn't finish outside of the bottom three, but with the removal of the promotion/relegation system between the BBL and Division 1, this had little consequence.

Watford Royals
The lack of fortune and an ageing venue prompted the franchise to look at relocating and the team found a suitable, yet temporary solution in the neighbouring town of Watford. In preparation for the move, the franchise was rebranded as Hemel & Watford Royals in 1996 and they made the move from the Dacorum Centre to Watford Leisure Centre in 1997. The move had little effect on the team's playing performance and they finished 13th out of 13 in the 1997–1998 season (3–33). Royals' stay in Watford lasted just one season and, in 1998, with the promise of a future purpose-built arena being offered in the town of Milton Keynes, the team packed up, moved and renamed themselves as the Milton Keynes Lions.

Milton Keynes Lions
Lions' on-court performances were an instant improvement and the franchise began a slow but noticeable turnaround, reaching the Semi-finals of the National Cup and also the end-of-season Play-offs for the first time in eight seasons in 2000. After a hugely successful run, the franchise reached its first major final in 2002 with an appearance at the SkyDome Arena in the BBL Trophy. The Lions fought valiantly but eventually lost to the all-conquering Chester Jets, losing 90–89 in a close contest. From then on, the Lions remained a competitive force in the league, often qualifying for the post-season Play-offs (though having little impact on the final outcome), and an appearance in the BBL Cup Semi-final in 2005 was considered to be a major landmark.

2007–08 season
It was announced on 8 May 2007 that coach Tom Hancock would not coach the Lions for the 2007–08 season, after just one term at the helm. On 17 May, the club declared owner Vince Macaulay-Razaq, a former player and coach of the franchise, would be appointed head coach for the proceeding season. The signing of Yorick Williams during the pre-season was a massive coup, and for many fans signalled the dawning of a new era for the club. During this exciting time and in preparation for a planned move to a new arena, the club also undertook a rebranding initiative, redesigning the logo and changing the kit colours from the traditional purple and gold, to a more dynamic black, gold and white, as well as the establishment of a new Academy in partnership with Milton Keynes College. The Milton Keynes College Lions Basketball Academy is headed by Lions' player Mike New.

With Macaulay back controlling the club on court as well as off it, the team's standing in the league was immediately matched to his own ambition as the club's owner. The veteran team performed sensationally and by the Christmas break they were well in contention for the league crown, resting in second place behind title-rivals Newcastle Eagles, who coincidentally they beat in their first-ever BBL Cup Final appearance at the National Indoor Arena (NIA), on 13 January 2008. Milton Keynes led for most of the game and sealed the 69–66 victory when New scored the final points of the game to end a Newcastle resurgence, handing the Lions franchise its first piece of silverware.

After finishing 4th in the league (19–14), Lions qualified for the post-season Play-offs with a seeded home-court Quarter-final tie against Scottish Rocks. The home team eased past the Rocks, 105–93, with the game filmed live in front of Setanta Sports cameras. For the first time in its history, Milton Keynes progressed to the Championship Finals weekend at the NIA where they defeated league champions Newcastle Eagles (63–72) on the way to the final eventually succumbing to Guildford Heat, 88–100, again live on Setanta Sports. The incredible achievements of the season, earned coach Macaulay-Razaq the accolade of BBL's Coach of the Year. Another highlight of the Lions' most successful season in history was the development of players through the new Academy with 18-year-old Greg Harvey progressing onto the roster in the latter stages of the season.

2008–09 season
As of 2008, Lions expected to be playing at the brand-new 4,500-seat capacity arena:mk adjacent to the new stadium:mk (home to Milton Keynes Dons football team). The move to their new home would have seen the Lions play in one of the BBL's biggest, modern venues, rivalling the homes of the Rocks and Newcastle. Unfortunately, the completion of the arena was delayed due to the deferral of proposed commercial developments around the site (which would have funded the project). With the demolition of Lions' current home, Bletchley Centre, scheduled for November 2009, the lack of an alternative venue raised question marks as to the future of the franchise remaining in Milton Keynes.

On court, there were big expectations following the successful campaign previously, but the 2008–09 season didn't start off too well for the Lions, with defeat to Guildford in the Cup Winners' Cup. After losing 91–89 in the first leg at Guildford, the Heat rolled over the Lions to a 68–60 victory at the Bletchley Centre, and a 159–149 series win. Further woe was added with a BBL Cup Quarter-final exit at the hands of visiting Everton Tigers, coupled with an exit at the 1st Round of the Trophy. The disastrous season came to an abrupt end in April, with a 14–19 record and 9th-placed finish meaning the Lions missing out on the end-of-season Playoffs.

2009–10 season 
With the demolition of the Bletchley Centre looming, the club sought to find an alternative venue for home games and on 31 July 2009 announced that from January 2010, the Lions would be playing out of Middleton Hall at thecentre:mk as a temporary measure until the new arena:mk was due to be completed, later in the year. The Lions played their last game in front of a packed Bletchley Centre crowd on 18 December, with a dramatic 98–97 victory over Guildford Heat. Robert Youngblood scored the winning point from the free-throw line and thus scored the last basket for Lions at their former home.

After Middleton Hall decided upon changes that would no longer make it suitable for basketball, the Lions were forced yet again to search for another new home venue, for at least the 2010–2011 season. The club secured a three-game lease for an out-of-town venue at Stoke Mandeville in Aylesbury to begin their 2010–2011 campaign, and decided upon renovating a site in the centre of Milton Keynes to host home games for the duration of the season. A three-year deal was agreed upon to use a warehouse in Winterhill and convert it into a 1,400-seat basketball arena and practice venue. The venue opened as the MK Lions Arena at the end of November 2010.

2010–11 season 
In his first season as head coach, former Lions player Mike New led the team to a disappointing 10th-place finish in the British Basketball League. Despite now boasting a fantastic full-time basketball venue, which featured two permanent courts – allowing the teams throughout the Lions banner to train more than ever before, the club missed out on qualifying for the play-offs. One of the few highlights of the season was the play of American guard Demarius Bolds, who was among the league leaders in several statistics as he was named Lions' Player of the Year.

2011–12 season 
2011–12 saw the Lions miss the play-offs for a second successive season, as they finished 9th in the Championship table – one place and four points behind 8th-placed Guildford Heat for the last post-season berth. A heavy 102–67 defeat to Leicester saw elimination at the first hurdle in the BBL Cup, however the team would later go close to making the BBL Trophy final. After topping their group in round robin play, Lions won the home leg of their semi-final against Plymouth Raiders in front of a sold-out Prestige Homes Arena, before suffering a 188–186 defeat on aggregate (after OT) in the return leg. Success was however found on a personal level, as Nathan Schall won the BBL dunk competition as part of the BBL Cup Final festivities and Stefan Gill completed the dunking double as he was crowned dunk contest champion at the World Basketball Festival.

Departure from Milton Keynes 
Following the conclusion of the 2011–12 season, the owners of Prestige Homes Arena triggered an opt-out clause in the lease to let the building as a retail outlet. A planning application to change the building from a sporting facility to retail unit was approved by Milton Keynes Council, thus leaving the club without a home venue for the third time in as many seasons. Owner Vince Macaulay searched during the summer of 2012 to secure a new base for Lions home games, which included public pleas to local businesses for help in finding a new home as offers from cities around the UK poured in to relocate the team. On 17 July, a local newspaper revealed negotiations to secure the Lions' future in Milton Keynes were ongoing, with Macaulay hoping to finalise a deal with sufficient time to begin preparation for the new season, slated to begin away to the re-formed Manchester Giants on 21 September. On 30 July, with the country's interest in basketball heightened by Great Britain's participation in the London 2012 Olympic basketball tournament, Macaulay revealed his search to find a home venue had been unsuccessful and the club would be forced to leave Milton Keynes. In addition to the loss of professional basketball games, the move was a big blow to Milton Keynes residents who had enjoyed extensive community and schools' basketball programmes since the Lions arrived in 1998. It was not then known what effect the team's departure would have on the many school teams and community projects, but Macaulay stated that he wished to remain involved in the development of youth basketball in Milton Keynes in some form. Questions also remained as to the future of the Milton Keynes Lions College Academy which enabled young adults to attend basketball practice five days a week whilst furthering their education – several of whom had gone on to sign professional deals with the first team.

When faced with the challenge of finding a new home outside of Milton Keynes, Macaulay shortlisted two new locations:

First was Cardiff, with Macaulay stating the appeal of every game feeling like Wales versus England being an exciting prospect. However, he ultimately found that agreeing a deal with the proposed arena's owners would be unlikely before the deadline he was facing of the start of the next season.

Second was Liverpool, Macaulay's hometown. Liverpool already had a BBL franchise – the Mersey Tigers, however they were in financial trouble so Macaulay proposed merging the two teams and a 50/50 ownership. The current owners were interested, but wanted Macaulay to send them his CV. Somewhat offended, he knew such a working relationship was unlikely to work, so withdrew his proposal. The Mersey Tigers folded the following season.

Completely out of options during the summer of 2012, Macaulay noted a lot of talk about the legacy of the London 2012 Olympic Games and investigated whether there would be any venues that could potentially become home for a basketball team once the games were over. Ultimately he entered discussions with the new owners of the Copper Box Arena, and the Milton Keynes Lions, soon to be the London Lions, had a new home.

Move to London

On 8 August 2012, an article in the Milton Keynes Citizen newspaper revealed the Lions would be moving to London for the 2012–13 season, taking residence at the Copper Box Arena in the Queen Elizabeth Olympic Park. As the Copper Box was being used for handball during the 2012 Summer Olympics and goalball during the 2012 Summer Paralympics, the venue needed to be converted for basketball use, and the Lions therefore began the season playing home games at Crystal Palace National Sports Centre. Owner Vince Macaulay-Razaq revealed the Lions would maintain links in Milton Keynes by keeping the Milton Keynes College Lions Basketball Academy open.

2012–13 season
Following the Lions' move to London, head coach Mike New elected to remain in Milton Keynes and continue his work as head coach of the Milton Keynes College Lions Basketball Academy. Lions owner Vince Macaulay coached the team for the 2012–13 season. London Lions played its home games at Crystal Palace National Sports Centre until the Copper Box Arena had been converted for basketball use following its role as handball arena during the London 2012 Olympic Games.

2013–14 season 
London Lions was successfully launched as the only professional basketball club in London. The team finished 6th in the regular season before losing to Worcester Wolves in the playoffs quarter-finals.

2014–15 season
The two previous seasons' BBL MVPs, Drew Sullivan and Zaire Taylor, were recruited for the 2014–15 season. The Lions reached the semi-finals of the BBL Trophy, losing to Leicester Riders. They finished 6th in the regular season. In the playoffs, the Lions defeated Worcester Wolves in the quarter-finals and Cheshire Phoenix in the semi-finals. The final, played in front of 14,700 at The O2 Arena, was won by Newcastle Eagles, who completed the clean sweep of British basketball titles.

2015–16 season
Nigel Lloyd took over as head coach for the 2015–16 season. Joe Ikhinmwin, the only senior player retained from the previous season's run to the play-off final, was made captain. Olumide Oyedeji would later rejoin in October following a serious injury to Demond Watt. Alex Owumi signed in December following further roster changes. The season ended with defeat to Sheffield Sharks in the play-off quarter-finals, on their way to winning the trophy.

2016–17 season
A more stable summer saw Nigel Lloyd remain in charge, bringing back Alex Owumi, Andre Lockhart, Jamal Williams, Joe Ikhinmwin and Kai Williams. Zaire Taylor also returned after a year away, along with Derek Hall and Rashad Hassan. A 9–1 start to the season in all competitions suggested great promise, but the departure of Hall after only 3 games and a season-ending injury to Jamal Williams disrupted the team's form. Defeat to Newcastle Eagles in the BBL Cup followed shortly afterwards. Reinforcements arrived in the shape of Navid Niktash and Zak Wells but the early season form couldn't be recaptured.

2017–18 season 
After Lloyd stepped down as head coach at the beginning of the 17–18 season, Mariusz Karol was appointed as head coach and lead the team to a 9 – 3 start before losing 4 out of the next 6. This led to a mutual agreement with team management for him to step down as head coach and club director / owner Vince Macaulay-Razaq to become head coach.

2018–19 season 

The team won its first silverware since rebranding as London Lions, beating Glasgow Rocks in the BBL Cup Final. They were beaten in the BBL Trophy Final by London City Royals, before winning the BBL league championship. Justin Robinson won his second BBL MVP award in a row.

2019–20 season 

Lions changed their colours from their traditional purple and gold to black, silver and white. The season was curtailed prematurely due to the COVID-19 pandemic, with no champions being named.

European debut

In the 2020–21 season, the Lions played in European competition for the first time in club history. They were confirmed to have a spot in the qualifying rounds for the fifth season of the Basketball Champions League (BCL). however they failed to qualify for the tournament proper, losing 77–73 to Neptūnas in the single game qualifying tie.

In the 2021–22 season, the Lions made their debut in the FIBA Europe Cup, which meant their debut in the group phase of a European competition. On 13 October 2021, the Lions beat Donar Groningen away to register their first-ever European win.

Home arenas

 Dacorum Leisure Centre (1977–1997)
 Watford Leisure Centre (1997–1998)
 Bletchley Centre (1998–2009)
 Middleton Hall (thecentre:mk) (2010)
 Prestige Homes Arena (2010–2012)
 Crystal Palace National Sports Centre (2012–2013)
 Copper Box Arena (2013–present)

Note: Between 1998 and 2002, some home games were played at Planet Ice Milton Keynes for TV broadcasting purposes. Between 2017 and 2020, some home games were played at University of East London SportsDock and Brixton Recreation Centre. In the 2022-23 season, some European home games were played at Wembley Arena.

Season-by-season records

Honours

BBL Championship
Winners: (1) 2018–19
Runners Up (2) 2017–18, 2020–21

BBL Play-offs
 Winners: (0) 
Runners Up (5) 2007–08, 2014–15, 2017–18, 2020–21, 2021–22

BBL Cup
 Winners: (3)  2007–08, 2018–19, 2022–23
Runners Up (1) 2020–21

BBL Trophy
 Winners: (1)  2020–21
Runners Up (3) 2001–02, 2018–19, 2021–22

Current roster

Depth chart

European matches

Matches 

Notes
 QB: Qualification Group B
 QD: Qualification Group D
 RS: Regular season
 R2: Second round

See also
 London Lions (women)
 British Basketball League
 Milton Keynes College Lions Basketball Academy
 Milton Keynes Breakers

References

External links
 London Lions (official website)

London Lions (basketball)
Basketball teams established in 1977
Basketball teams in England
Basketball teams in London
Sport in Milton Keynes
British Basketball League teams
Sport in Watford
Hemel Hempstead
1977 establishments in England